Khyber Pakhtunkhwa Information Technology Board or KPITB is a public sector autonomous organization of the Khyber Pakhtunkhwa government established in May 2011.

References

External links
 

Departments of Government of Khyber Pakhtunkhwa
Information technology in Pakistan
Information technology organizations